Philipp Sturm (born 23 February 1999) is an Austrian footballer who plays as a midfielder for TSV Hartberg in Austrian Bundesliga.

Club career

FC Liefering
Philipp Sturm started his career with the youth team of SV Wals-Grünau. 2009 he came to the youth of FC Red Bull Salzburg and then to Salzburgs football academy, where he played for all teams (U15, U16, U18).

2017 he signed with FC Liefering. He was also member of the FC Red Bull Salzburg U19 team which won the UEFA Youth League 2016/17 and the team 2017/18.

He made his professional debut playing for Red Bull Salzburg's feeder team, Liefering, against Kapfenberger SV on 21 July 2017.

Chemnitzer FC
On 30 June 2019, Sturm joined Chemnitzer FC on a free transfer.

TSV Hartberg

References

External links

 

Living people
1999 births
Austrian footballers
Austria youth international footballers
Association football midfielders
FC Liefering players
Chemnitzer FC players
TSV Hartberg players
2. Liga (Austria) players
3. Liga players
Austrian Football Bundesliga players
Austrian expatriate footballers
Expatriate footballers in Germany
Austrian expatriate sportspeople in Germany